Mentone is a town in DeKalb County, Alabama, United States.  It is located atop Lookout Mountain.

A number of private summer camps are located near Mentone. For a number of years, Mentone has hosted an unusually large number of summer camps. Mentone attracts many visitors and tourists annually, partly due to the summer camps.

History
The community was named after Menton in France and was incorporated in 1935.

In April 2003, it was the town nearest the epicenter of a magnitude 4.6 earthquake. The surprise quake had alarmed residents in the dark hours of the morning and was felt across several states, but it had caused no injuries and only minor damage to the town. Mentone is in the Ridge and Valley region of the southwestern Appalachian Mountains, an area that generally goes several decades between significant earthquakes but has never had a major one in recorded history.

Geography
Mentone is located in eastern DeKalb County at  (34.572360, -85.580283). It is bordered to the west by the town of Valley Head. The western border of the town, with Valley Head, follows the western slopes of the mountain. Extending south from the town center is the mountain's ridgecrest that rises to an elevation of  within the town limits.

Climate 
Mentone has a humid subtropical climate (Cfa) with hot, humid summers and cool, wet winters.

Demographics

 census, there were 451 people, 201 households, and 127 families residing in the town. The racial makeup of the town was 95.34% White, 1.11% Black or African American, 0.67% Native American, and 2.88% from two or more races. Furthermore, 0.22% of the population were Hispanic or Latino of any race. The 2010 census listed the population at 360, down from 451 in 2000.

There were 201 households, of which 25.9% had children under the age of 18 living with them, 49.3% were married couples living together, 7.5% had a female householder with no husband present, and 36.8% were non-families. Moreover, 33.8% of all households were made up of individuals, and 16.4% had someone living alone who was 65 years of age or older. The average household size was 2.23 persons, and the average family size was 2.87 persons.

Within the town, the population was spread out, with 23.1% under the age of 18, 7.1% from 18 to 24, 21.3% from 25 to 44, 27.9% from 45 to 64, and 20.6% from 65 and older. The median age was 44 years. For every 100 females, there were 90.3 males. For every 100 females aged 18 and over, there were 86.6 males.

The median income for a household in the town was $24,625, and the median income for a family was $28,750. Males had a median income of $27,411 versus $17,656 for females. The per capita income for the town was $13,561. About 13.5% of families and 12.2% of the population were below the poverty line, with 10.0% of those under age 18 and 14.0% of those aged 65 or over.

References

External links
Mentone Area Preservation Association
Mentone, Alabama Information

DeKalb County, Alabama Tourist Association

Lookout Mountain
Towns in DeKalb County, Alabama
Towns in Alabama